Dominik Meffert and Simon Stadler were the defending champions but decided not to participate.
Sanchai Ratiwatana and Sonchat Ratiwatana won the title, defeating Hsieh Cheng-peng and Lee Hsin-han 7–6(9–7), 6–3 in the final.

Seeds

Draw

Draw

References
 Main Draw
 Qualifying Draw

All Japan Indoor Tennis Championships - Doubles
2012 Doubles